Elophila nymphaeata, the brown china mark, is a species of moth of the family Crambidae. It was described by Carl Linnaeus in his 1758 10th edition of Systema Naturae. It is found in Europe and across the Palearctic to the Russian Far East and China. The moth is notable as its larva, like most members of the crambid subfamily Acentropinae, is aquatic and has tracheal gills.

The wingspan is 16–20 mm.The forewings vary from yellow-ochreous to rather dark fuscous ; basal area with dentate white and dark fuscous lines ; a white subcostal spot before first line ; lines whitish, obscure, dark-margined, first angulated above middle, second with deep abrupt sinuation inwards below middle ; median band almost occupied by three white dark edged blotches ; an irregular interrupted white dark-edged and dark-veined subterminal streak. Hindwings as forewings, but base white, median band white except discal spot, second lineless sinuate.The larva is light brownish ; dorsal line darker ; head light brown ; plate of 2 black-edged. In flat oval
floating cases of leaf-fragments, on Potamogeton, Hydrocharis,
Sparganium, etc

The moth flies from May to September depending on the location.

The larvae feed on Potamogeton, Nymphaeaceae and Nuphar lutea.

Subspecies
Elophila nymphaeata nymphaeata
Elophila nymphaeata silarigla Speidel, 1984 (Algeria and Morocco)

References

External links

 Brown china-mark at UKMoths
 Nature Spot
 Lepidoptera of Belgium
 Lepiforum.de

Acentropinae
Moths of Europe
Taxa named by Carl Linnaeus
Aquatic insects
Moths described in 1758